The judiciary of South Korea is the judicial branch of South Korean central government, established by Chapter 5 and 6 of the Constitution of South Korea.

 Under the Chapter 5 of constitution, ordinary courts on all cases except matters of Constitutional review, and military courts as extraordinary court on matters of military justice are defined. And these ordinary courts and military courts shall have Supreme Court of Korea as their highest court. Generally, ordinary courts have three-level hierarchy and constituted by independent Judges, fourteen Supreme Court Justices by statute and one Chief Justice of Supreme court among Justices. Yet military courts are organized only in first instance of three-level hierarchy at peacetime, and their final appellate always falls on jurisdiction of the Supreme Court even in wartime.

 Under the Chapter 6 of constitution, Constitutional Court of Korea is defined as one and only, highest court on matters of Constitutional review, including Judicial review, Impeachment, Dissolution of unconstitutional political parties, Competence dispute among government agencies and Constitutional complaint. It is constituted by nine Justices by the Constitution and one President of Constitutional court among Justices.

These two chapters describe judiciary of South Korea into two groups by jurisdiction of matters. One is Constitutional Court which is highest court on adjudication of matters mainly on Constitutionality. Another is ordinary courts on matters except jurisdiction of Constitutional Court. These ordinary courts are shall have Supreme Court as their highest court.

Chief Justice of Supreme Court and President of Constitutional court are treated as two equivalent heads of judiciary branch in South Korea by article 15 of Constitutional Court Act. Though, since relationship between Supreme Court and Constitutional Court is not thoroughly defined anywhere in Constitution of South Korea and other related statutes, these two highest court of South Korea have been struggling about jurisdiction against each other for long years.

Institutional traits

Diversified supreme courts

As influenced from European judiciaries such as Austrian judicial system and German judicial system contemporary South Korean judiciary divides its role of highest court into two apex Courts.
 Supreme Court of Korea : As highest ordinary court of South Korean , the Supreme Court of Korea has comprehensive final appellate jurisdiction over every cases except jurisdiction of the Constitutional Court of Korea on constitutional matters
 Constitutional Court of Korea : As constitutional court of South Korea, the Constitutional Court of Korea has original jurisdiction over major constitutional matters, including Judicial review on constitutionality of statute, review of all Impeachments, decision on Prohibition and Dissolution of political parties, Competence dispute about demarcation of power among central government agencies and local governments, and adjudication of Constitutional complaint

American styled legal education

Before South Korea adopted American law school system in year 2007, South Korea trained its legal professionals mainly by Judicial Research and Training Institute (JRTI). Another route was direct recruitment by South Korean Armed Forces as 'Judge Advocates'. The trainees at JRTI was selected by an nation-wide exam on jurisprudence called 'Judicial exam'. These trainees were commonly trained and competed against each other in the JRTI for 2 years, as their career option after graduation was restricted according to graduation records of JRTI. However, after reform of 2007, all of legal professionals in South Korea (except paralegals such as Judicial scrivener) are trained by American styled 3-year law school system.

Ordinary courts
Ordinary courts, usually called as just 'Courts', of South Korea are established by Chapter 5 of Constitution of South Korea. All of ordinary courts are under the jurisdiction of the national judiciary; independent local courts are not permitted. And these ordinary courts are divided into 'Supreme Court' and 'other (lower) courts' under Article 101(2) of the Constitution. In this way, the Constitutional Court of Korea explains that the Constitution itself does not exactly guarantee three level instance system; The article 101(2) of the Constitution means, according to the Constitutional Court, that final appellate jurisdiction of ordinary cases should always be with the Supreme Court of Korea. Thus, enacting some of cases outside of the Constitutional Court's jurisdiction as available of only one chance of appeal or no chance of appeal is constitutionally valid in South Korea unless such case is finally ruled in the Supreme Court.

Statutory ground for hierarchy of ordinary courts, including three-tiered instance system for typical cases, is defined by 'Court Organization Act' of South Korea. Under article 3(1), 28 and 28-4 of the Court Organization Act, hierarchy of ordinary courts in South Korea has three levels; District Courts (plus family court, bankruptcy court, and administrative court, which are specialized courts on matters of family, bankruptcy and administration laws), High Courts (plus patent court which is specialized appellate court on matters of intellectual property, for reviewing ruling or decision made by the 'Intellectual Property Trial And Appeal Board') and Supreme Court. In this way, concept of 'other (lower) courts at specified levels' of article 101(2) of the Constitution is divided into 6 courts, so there are basically 7 different types of courts including the Supreme Court inside hierarchy of ordinary judicial system, as described in article 3(1) of the Act; Supreme Court, High Court, Patent Court, District Court, Family Court, Administrative Court, and Bankruptcy Court. Branch courts and Municipal courts are regarded as part of District Court and Family Court under article 3(2) of the Act.

Supreme Court of Korea

The Supreme Court, seated in Seocho-gu, Seoul, consists of fourteen Supreme Court Justices, including one Chief Justice. Chief Justice of Supreme Court is appointed by President of South Korea with the consent of the National Assembly, and has authority over administration of all ordinary courts. Other Justices are also appointed by President of South Korea with consent of National Assembly, though candidates for new Justice is recommended by Chief Justice. The Justices and Chief Justice must be at least 45 years old, and shall have at least 20 years of experience practicing law with license of attorney at law. They serve for six-year terms; the Chief Justice cannot be reappointed, but term of the other Justices are renewable under article 105(2) of constitution. However, none of Justices tried to renew his/her term after Sixth Republic since it could harm independence of judiciary by increasing influence of executive President. Justices and Chief Justice cannot be older than age 70.

Judges in Research division
Justices in Supreme Court are assisted by seconded Judges from sub-Supreme courts, and they are called 'Judges in Research division' or 'Research Judges'. This secondment is decided by Chief Justice of Supreme Court. Because under article 44 of Court Organization Act, the Chief Justice has power to transfer every single Judge from one of ordinary courts to any other ordinary courts in South Korea.  Function of seconded Judges in Supreme Court is similar to Law clerks in ordinary courts. They serve about 2 years as judicial assistant for Justices, yet not all seconded Judges are not individually attached to one of Justice, as some of seconded Judges serve as research group or panel to assist decisions of whole Supreme Court.

National Court Administration
Administration affairs(including fiscal, personnel and human resource affairs) of all ordinary courts in South Korea is governed by institution called 'The National Court Administration (NCA)', which is established in Supreme Court under article 19 of Court Organization Act. Head of NCA is appointed by Chief Justice, and is appointed among Justices. Though this centralized power on Chief Justice can eventually harm independence of individual Judges and even Justices, NCA is also serves for judicial independence from other branches of government.

High Courts and District Courts
Below the Supreme Court come appellate courts which are called 'High Courts', stationed in six of the country's major cities. High Courts typically consist of a panel of three judges. Below these are District Courts and its Branch Courts, which exist in most of the large cities of South Korea. Below these are Municipal Courts, positioned all over the country and limited to small claims and petty offenses. Municipal courts usually do not have jurisdiction over criminal cases. 'Specialized courts (not to be confused with 'Special courts' under article 110(1) of Constitution)' also exist for family, administrative, bankruptcy and patent cases.

Judges
Judges except Supreme Court Justices and Chief Justice, serving in ordinary courts are appointed by the Chief Justice with the consent of the Council of Supreme Court Justices. Judges serve for ten-year renewable terms, up to age of 65. After reform of ordinary courts in early 2010's, at least 10 years of experience practicing law with license of attorney at law is required for Judge. Goal of reform was changing structure of ordinary courts as courts in common law system, such as United States. This reform of courts in early 2010's includes abolishing advancement and promotion opportunities for Judges to become head of each High Court and District Court. Now in year 2022, heads of each High Court and District Court (which are called as 'Chief Judge' of each court) are mainly elected among and by Judges in each court, and appointed by Chief Justice in Supreme Court. Before this reform, all Judges were appointed just after finishing two-year training program in Judicial Research and Training Institute(JRTI), which selects its trainees who passed difficult test on matters of jurisprudence after LL.B. degree.

Judges in South Korea is protected from external political pressure under article 106(1) of constitution. No judge can be removed from office unless the judges is imprisoned as criminal punishment. However, It is noteworthy that Judges in South Korea can be refused from renewing its term, and can be transferred to different court against their will.

Judicial Assistant Officials
Judicial Assistant Officials (JAO) is a Judge-equivalent officer who has limited power to rule over several procedural matters under supervision of Judges. Following article 54 of Court Organization Act, JAO is appointed among court officials with 5 to 10 years of experience on procedural matters in court. Unless interested party raise objection on ruling of JAO, its ruling has equivalent power to ruling of Judge. When ruling of JAO is challenged with objection, supervising Judge should make decision whether or not to accept such objection. JAO system is mainly influenced by German judicial system, called Rechtspfleger.

Law Clerks
From year 2011, fresh J.D. graduates from Law school are selected as Law clerk to assist Judges in High courts and District courts for 2 to 3 years, under article 53-2 of Court Organization Act. Law clerks in South Korea is recruited by each of six High courts, though some of top-tier graduates are appointed as 'Judicial Researcher' at the Supreme Court, which is basically a law clerk for Supreme Court Justices. It is noteworthy that Law clerks in South Korea are not recruited by individual Judges and Supreme Court Justices.

Military courts
Under article 110(1) of the Constitution and 'Military Court Act', Military Court (or Courts-martial) is established permanently in both peacetime and wartime as 'Special court (or Extraordinary court)' in each South Korean armed forces. As Military Courts are not established inside Court Organization Act's boundary, these Courts are regarded as out side of conventional judicial hierarchy made of ordinary courts. The Military Courts rule over criminal cases when the accused is member of armed forces, and they are composed of Military Judges constituted of Judge advocates appointed by generals in South Korean armed forces. South Korean Judge advocates are military officers qualified as attorney at law in South Korea, yet not Judges in ordinary courts. However, final appellate jurisdiction of this military-criminal cases still falls under jurisdiction of Supreme Court of Korea according to article 110(2) of the Constitution. Permanent military court even established in peacetime created various problems as South Korea runs mandatory conscription system. After repeated crimes inside armed forces, the permanent military court in peacetime was pointed out as one of main reason for continued suffer of victims, because old military court system in South Korea was inclined to protecting high-ranking military officers even when they were criminals. It led to bold reform of military court system in year 2021, abolishing High Military Court in peacetime and transferring every appellate jurisdiction of military crime cases to Seoul High Court, which is one of High Courts in ordinary court hierarchy.

Constitutional court

The Constitutional Court, seated in Jongno-gu, Seoul and independent from the Supreme Court, is only and highest court on matters of adjudication on Constitutionality including Judicial review, Constitutional review on competence dispute, Constitutional complaint, plus deciding cases of impeachment and cases of dissolution of unconstitutional political parties. Other judicial matters are overseen by the ordinary courts. This system was newly established in the Sixth Republic, to reinforce protection on fundamental rights and democracy against rise of authoritarian government. The Constitutional Court consists of nine Justices. Of these Justices, three are recommended by the Chief Justice of the Supreme court, three by the National Assembly, and three by the President of South Korea; however, all must be appointed by the President of South Korea. The President of the Constitutional Court, which is chief of Justices in the Constitutional Court, is appointed among Constitutional Court Justices by the President of South Korea with consent of the National Assembly. The Justices of Constitutional court, including President of Constitutional Court serve for six-year terms, and cannot be older than age 70. Justices except President of Constitutional court can renew its term, though most of Justices never tried to renew his/her term, as Justices in Supreme court refused its reappointment since it could harm independence of judiciary. Detailed organization and procedure of the Constitutional Court is defined under 'Constitutional Court Act'

Rapporteur Judges
Under article 19 of Constitutional Court Act, Rapporteur Judges are appointed by President of the Constitutional Court of Korea. They serve as judicial assistant for Justices in Constitutional Court. Rapporteur Judges serve for ten-year renewable terms up to age of 60 and paid as same as Judges in ordinary courts. It is noticeable that Rapporteur Judges serve longer than Justices in Constitutional Court, while Research Judges serve shorter than Justices in Supreme Court. This professional assistant office is designed to ensure continuity of constitutional adjudication in South Korea. Yet some of Rapporteur Judges office is filled by seconded Judges from ordinary courts, and seconded government officials including Prosecutors. These seconded Judges and Prosecutors serve for 1 to 2 years as Rapporteur Judges.

Department of Court Administration
Under article 17 of Constitutional Court Act, Department of Court Administration (DCA) is established in Constitutional Court. Head of department is called as 'Secretary General', and is appointed by President of Constitutional Court. As NCA of Supreme Court, Department of Court Administration deals with every matters on court administration including fiscal, personnel and human resource affairs. Yet while head of NCA is appointed among Justices in Supreme Court, Secretary General is not appointed among Justices in Constitutional Court.

Separation of powers inside Judicial branch
The current Constitution of South Korea distributes power of judicial review inside judiciary between ordinary courts in Chapter 5 and constitutional court in Chapter 6. Under article 107(2) in Chapter 5, the ordinary courts including the Supreme Court have ultimate jurisdiction over reviewing constitutionality of sub-statutory decrees, regulations or actions made by administrative level. Under article 111(1) in Chapter 6, the Constitutional Court have ultimate jurisdiction over reviewing constitutionality of sub-constitutional statutes made by legislature level, even without request from the ordinary courts through article 68(2) of the Constitutional Court Act. In this structure of power separation, ordinary courts and the constitutional court can practically contend over each other's ruling. Yet the Constitution does not clarify who should arbitrate when the Supreme Court and the Constitutional Court struggles against each other.

One of major power struggle issue between two highest courts is constitutional complaint over judgment of ordinary court. As in Austria, constitutional complaint on ordinary court's judgment is strictly forbidden according to article 68(1) of Constitutional Court Act. However, the Constitutional Court adjudicates that such article of the Act is lacks constitutionality, unless it is interpreted as constitutional complaint over judgment of ordinary court should be exceptionally allowed when the judgement applicated unconstitutional statute which is already officially nullified before the judgment by judicial review of the Constitutional Court. 

This kind of judicial review ruling in the Constitutional Court of Korea is called 'conditionally unconstitutional', which is actually a declaration that statute under judicial review is currently constitutional, yet the statute must be interpreted in specific way which is aligned to constitutional order interpreted by the Constitutional Court, thus all ordinary courts including the Supreme Court of Korea should be bound by such interpretation on statute of the Constitutional Court. The concept of such ruling is attempt of the Constitutional Court of Korea to adopt unrivaled status of German constitutional court, where constitutional court can suggest binding interpretation on statute to other highest ordinary courts of Germany, which is called 'constitutional interpretation of statute'. The German constitutional court can also adjudicate constitutional complaint over judgment of ordinary court, functioning as actual cassation, which led the constitutional court to very summit of constitutional system.

The Supreme Court of Korea opposes the Constitutional Court of Korea on both binding power of 'conditionally unconstitutional' ruling and possibility of constitutional complaint over judgment of ordinary court, since it could turn equivalent status of Supreme Court against the Constitutional Court into substantially inferior status as German federal ordinary courts against German federal constitutional court. However, whether the Constitutional Court of Korea can exercise power of suggesting binding interpretation not only on the Constitution but also on statute (by conditional ruling), or can review unconstitutionality of ordinary court judgment (by constitution complaint procedure) still remains unsolved, since the Constitution and even associated statutes never clarify how this struggle should be settled.

Issues and Criticism
 South Korea's judiciary is often criticized for being overly lenient toward criminals. For example, in the Cho Doo-soon Case involving the brutal rape of an eight-year old girl, the 56 year old male rapist was sentenced to only 12 years in prison.
 According to OECD study in 2013 and 2015, though South Korean ordinary courts achieved top-tier among OECD countries, South Korean's confidence on judicial system is dropping rapidly from 2010's. It is notable that confidence level on judicial branch is lower than executive branches of South Korean government.
 Judges in lower ordinary courts of South Korea are exposed to authoritative influence of Supreme Court Chief Justice and the President of South Korea. For example, all lower ordinary court Judges are usually transferred to different courts all around South Korea per about two years by order of Chief Justice, by article 44 of Court Organization Act. This strong influence of Chief Justice on each of lower ordinary court Judges later provoked pressure to reform courts.

See also
 Constitution of South Korea
 Politics of South Korea
 Government of South Korea
 National Assembly (South Korea)
 Supreme Court of Korea
 Constitutional Court of Korea
 Law of South Korea

Notes and References

External links
 Supreme Court of Korea
 Military Court of Korea
 Constitutional Court of Korea

Politics of South Korea
Government of South Korea
Judiciary of South Korea